Ragna Johanne Forsberg (3 February 1908 – 4 September 1984) was a Norwegian politician for the Labour Party.

She served as a deputy representative to the Norwegian Parliament from Østfold during the terms 1958–1961 and 1961–1965.

References

1908 births
1984 deaths
Labour Party (Norway) politicians
Women members of the Storting
Members of the Storting
20th-century Norwegian women politicians
20th-century Norwegian politicians